Francesco Rossetti (Trento, 14 September 1833 – Padova, 20 April 1885) was a notable Italian experimental physicist.

Biography
Son of Giovanni Battista, Rossetti started his education in his natal town Trento. He then attended the University of Padova and, from 1854 to 1857, the University of Vienna, where he heard classes in mathematics, chemistry and physics, and graduated in physics and mathematics. His advisor was Andreas von Ettingshausen. Among his fellow students there were Josef Stefan (future supervisor of Ludwig Boltzmann) and Ernst Mach. 

In 1857 he became a teacher at the Liceo di Santa Caterina in Venice. In 1860 he was hired by the University of Padova. Having obtained a year's leave by the Austrian government, he spent 1864 in Paris working in the laboratory of the physicist and chemist Henri-Victor Regnault. In 1866 he became extraordinary professor and in 1880 full professor of experimental physics at the University of Padova. He was the dean of the faculty of science from 1876 to 1885. He has been member of the National Academy of Sciences since 1879, of the National Lincei Academy since 1882, and of other important Italian and international scientific academies and societies.

His scientific activity mainly concerned electrostatics, electrochemistry, and thermometry of flames. He published 42 papers. In 1862 he was the doctoral advisor of Andrea Naccari.

Main works by Rossetti
 Sull'uso delle coppie termoelettriche nella misura delle temperature 1867.
 Sul maximum di densità e sulla dilatazione dell'acqua distillata, dell'acqua dell'Adriatico e di alcune soluzioni saline 1868.
 Sul magnetismo 1871.
 Uso della macchina di Holtz in alcune ricerche elettrometriche sui condensatori elettrici 1872.
 Sul potere specifico induttivo dei coibenti 1873.
 Nuovi studii sulle correnti delle macchine elettriche 1874.
  1874.
 Indagini sperimentali sulla temperatura del sole 1878.
 Sul potere assorbente, sul potere emissivo termico delle fiamme e sulla temperatura dell'arco voltaico 1878.

References

 Francesco Rossetti in Enciclopedia Biografica Universale Treccani, XVI, p. 614, Istituto della Enciclopedia Italiana, Roma, 2007.
 Rossetti, Francesco (1833-1885), Physiker in Österreichisches Biografisches Lexikon 1815-1950, Bd. 9 (Lfg. 43, 1986), S. 263
 Obituary of Francesco Rossetti, made by the secretary Blaserna of the Reale Accademia dei Lincei, Atti della Reale Accademia dei Lincei, anno CCLXXXII, 1884-85, serie quarta, Rendiconti, pag. 337.

External links
 Francesco Rossetti, Bibliografia italiana di elettricità e magnetismo, F. Sacchetto (1881).

19th-century Italian physicists
1833 births
1885 deaths